The first season of the American comedy-drama television series The Carrie Diaries premiered on The CW on January 14, 2013, and concluded on April 8, 2013, consisting of 13 episodes. Developed by Amy B. Harris, the series is based on the novel of the same name by Candace Bushnell, and serves as a prequel to the HBO series Sex and the City.

The Carrie Diaries was officially picked up for the 2012–13 television season on May 11, 2012. After Carrie's mother dies, she has to be strong and continue her life. This season revolves around Carrie and her last high school years, as well as her love life and friendships.

Cast and characters

Main
 AnnaSophia Robb as Carrie Bradshaw
 Austin Butler as Sebastian Kydd
 Ellen Wong as Jill "Mouse" Chen
 Katie Findlay as Maggie Landers
 Stefania Owen as Dorrit Bradshaw
 Brendan Dooling as Walt Reynolds
 Chloe Bridges as Donna LaDonna
 Freema Agyeman as Larissa Loughlin
 Matt Letscher as Tom Bradshaw

Recurring
 Josh Salatin as Simon Byrnes
 Kate Nowlin as Barbara
 Alexandra Miller and Whitney Vance as the Jens
 Scott Cohen as Harlan Silver
 Jake Robinson as Bennet Wilcox
 R.J. Brown as Thomas West
 Evan Crooks as Miller

Guest
 Terry Serpico as Mr. Kydd
 Richard Kohnke as George Silver
 Noelle Beck as Mrs. Kydd
 Nadia Dajani as Deb

Episodes

Ratings

DVR viewers

References

2013 American television seasons